Russell County Schools may refer to:

Russell County USD 407 (Kansas)
Russell County School District (Alabama)
Russell County Schools (Kentucky), in List of school districts in Kentucky
Russell County, Virginia#Education

See also
Russell County (disambiguation)